The 1990 Columbia Lions football team was an American football team that represented Columbia University during the 1990 NCAA Division I-AA football season. Columbia finished last in the Ivy League. 

In their second season under head coach Ray Tellier, the Lions compiled a 1–9 record and were outscored 292 to 115. Bruce Mayhew and Galen Snyder were the team captains.  

The Lions' 1–6 conference record placed eighth in the Ivy League standings. Columbia was outscored 168 to 56 by Ivy opponents. 

Columbia played its homes games at Lawrence A. Wien Stadium in Upper Manhattan, in New York City.

Schedule

References

Columbia
Columbia Lions football seasons
Columbia Lions football